Reef-Sunset Unified School District is a school district in the Central Valley of California. The district has its headquarters in Avenal. Enrollment is approximately 2664 students.

Schools
Adult schools
 Avenal Adult School (Avenal)

High schools
 Avenal High School (Avenal)
 Sunrise High School (Avenal)

Middle schools
 Reef-Sunset Middle School (Avenal)

Primary schools
 Avenal Elementary School (Avenal)
 Kettleman City Elementary School (Kettleman City, unincorporated area)
 Tamarack Elementary School (Avenal)

References

External links

 

School districts in Kings County, California